Thomas Eyre
(fl. 1890s) was a footballer who made 65 appearances in the Football League playing for Lincoln City. He played at left back. Either side of Lincoln, he played for Ashfield and Hamilton Academical in Scotland.

Notes

References

Year of birth missing
Year of death missing
Place of birth missing
Association football fullbacks
Ashfield F.C. players
Lincoln City F.C. players
Hamilton Academical F.C. players
English Football League players
Place of death missing
English footballers